Mania Tower is a high-rise building located in the centre of Pleven, Bulgaria.

The basement and the 2 lowest floors contain the City Centre Pleven shopping mall, while the tower is used as a business centre. The building was built as Hotel Pleven. In 2006, it was reconstructed and renovated. With its 60 m and 15 storeys it is the second tallest building in the city after the Pleven TV Tower.

External links
Official site
Nomination for building of the year 2008, with description and photos

Buildings and structures in Pleven
Shopping malls in Bulgaria
Hotels in Bulgaria
Defunct hotels